Anbari may refer to:
 Anbari, Hormozgan
 Anbari, South Khorasan
Abu Ali al-Anbari